Belmont Prisons is the terminus of the London Buses route 80.

It may refer to:
HM Prison High Down, for men
HM Prison Downview, for women

See also
Belmont Correctional Institution, a prison in St. Clairsville, Ohio, United States